Kizhakke Pogum Rail is a 1978 Indian Tamil-language romantic drama film co-written and directed by Bharathiraja, starring newcomers Sudhakar and M. R. Raadhika. It was released on 10 August 1978 and ran for over 365 days in theatres. The film was remade in Telugu as Toorpu Velle Railu (1979) and in Hindi by Bharathiraja as Saveray Wali Gaadi (1986).

Plot 
A young woman Panchali gets off a train named 'Kizhakke Pogum Rail' (Eastbound Train) and lands in the village Thamaraikulam which follows strict rules. There, Panchali is accommodated by her sister Karuthamma and her brother-in-law Ramaiah, Panchali informs her that their mother died a couple of days ago. Ramaiah starts to have an eye on Panchali.

Paranjothi is an unemployed graduate and a big fan of the poet Subramania Bharati who lives his father Maruthu and his sister Kanniyamma. His father Maruthu is a barber and considers Paranjothi as a good-for-nothing like all the villagers. After getting married, Kanniyamma leaves her birth home to live with her husband's family.

Panchali and Paranjothi slowly fall in love with each other. One day, the villagers spot Paranjothi running behind Panchali. At the gram panchayat, the panchayat members blame Paranjothi for trying to misbehave with Panchali. Only the retired military man Pattalathaar and the farmer Ponnandi support him, but the panchayat members overlook them, and they punish him. Maruthu shaves off the hair of his son and Paranjothi parades on a donkey in the streets of the village whereas Ramaiah forces Karuthamma to burn Panchali's arm with a piece of wood.

After the humiliation, Maruthu commits suicide in the village's lake. Paranjothi decides to leave the town, and he promises Panchali that he will come back to marry her. He also informs her that he will write a message on the last compartment of the 'Kizhakke Pogum Rail'. In the city, after several interviews, he finally finds a decent job.

Meanwhile, at the village court, Ramaiah complains that Karuthamma is a barren woman and he expresses his wish to marry Panchali. A few days later, the village is battered by heavy rains. To stop the rain, the villagers contrive the way to stop it, executing an ancient belief: one virgin woman has to walk naked around the village at sunrise. Unexpectedly, Panchali is chosen to be that woman.

The day of the ritual, Paranjothi gladly returns at his village, and he sees Panchali completely naked. He gives Panchali clothing and they both run away from the angry villagers. Pattalathaar helps the couple by stalling the villagers, and he is killed in the process. The lovers manage to catch the running 'Kizhakke Pogum Rail' under the eyes of the villagers.

Cast 
Sudhakar as Paranjothi
M. R. Raadhika as Panchali
Ganthimathi as Karuthamma
Goundamani as Ramaiah
G. Srinivasan as Maruthu
Vijayan as Pattalathaar
V. Janagarajan as Iyer (Panchayat member)
K. Bhagyaraj as Ponnandi
 Usha as Kanniyamma
Bharathiraja as the station master (uncredited)

Production 

Kizhakke Pogum Rail was the second film directed by Bharathiraja, and the debut film of Sudhakar and Raadhika (credited as M. R. Raadhika) as actors. The male lead role was originally offered to Sivachandran, who declined, while Sridevi was originally cast as the lead actress but later opted out. Raadhika contemplated leaving the film throughout the shoot, but was "offered chocolates" to complete the film. It was also the Tamil debut for Vijayan, and the feature film debut of Usha. The producer originally offered K. Bhagyaraj to direct, but he declined as he wanted to "complete at least a couple of more films as an assistant". Bhagyaraj remained as an assistant director. One part of the song "Poovarasampoo" was filmed at a temple off East Coast Road, while the rest of the song was filmed at Mettupalayam.

R. Selvaraj revealed the initial story for Kizhakke Pogum Rail had the character of Panchali character arriving to Chennai to visit Paranjothi, get molested by four young people by which she gets mentally affected and meets with an accident with Paranjothi saving her; however Selvaraj felt something was missing in the script and conveyed this to Bharathiraja for which he stopped the shoot. Selvaraj read a French novel where a queen will be walking naked on night in streets to abolish tax which he added in the script. After changing the complete screenplay, the shoot was restarted.

Soundtrack 
The soundtrack was composed by Ilaiyaraaja, with lyrics written by Kannadasan, Muthulingam, Gangai Amaran and Sirpi Balasubramaniam. The song "Kovil Mani Osai" is set to the Carnatic raga known as Shuddha Saveri, "Malargale" is set to Hamsadhvani, "Poovarasam Poo Poothachu" and "Mancholai Kilithano" are set to Suddha Dhanyasi.

Release and reception 
Kizhakke Pogum Rail was released on 10 August 1978, and distributed by Sri Amman Creations. Ananda Vikatan rated the film 55 out of 100, appreciating its latter half and the climax for its realism. The film became a major commercial success, completing a 365-day run in theatres, and Raadhika became popularly known by the sobriquet "Rayil Radhika". Malaysia Vasudevan won the Tamil Nadu State Film Award for Best Male Playback Singer for singing in the film.

Remakes 
Kizhakke Pogum Rail was remade in Telugu as Toorpu Velle Railu (1979) by Bapu, and in Hindi as Saveray Wali Gaadi (1986) by Bharathiraja himself.

References

Bibliography

External links 
 

1970s Tamil-language films
1978 films
1978 romantic drama films
Films about superstition
Films directed by Bharathiraja
Films scored by Ilaiyaraaja
Indian romantic drama films
Tamil films remade in other languages